Mads Falck Berven (born 23 May 1977 in Bergen, Norway) is a Norwegian jazz musician (guitar) and law graduate from University of Bergen, known from a series of albums and cooperations with the like of Øystein Moen, Eirik Hegdal, Magne Thormodsæter, Ole Marius Sandberg, Kåre Opheim, Gard Nilssen, Per Jørgensen, Olav Dale and Helén Eriksen.

Career 
Berven received lessons in piano and violin at a young age, and started playing classical guitar with Stein-Erik Olsen in 1992.  He is educated on the Jazz programme at Trondheim Musikkonservatorium (2003–07), and has played with a wide variety of artists and has many band projects. He was among other things for a number of years regular guitarist in Ralph Myerz and the Jack Herren Band.

Berven play in bands like "Dawn", "Robaat", "Duoz" for "Derreck" with John Hegre, "No får det vere rock", with Ole Thomsen and Ola Høyer and "Kniv og Taffel SwingJazz Orkester". He debuted as a solo artist with the album Mountains & the Sea (2011), an album with Kåre Opheim (drums) and Anders Bitustøyl (bass).

Honors 
Winner of "Kronstadfestivalen" within the Rock band "BLY" 1994
This years Live Band within Kniv og Taffel" 2002
Bergen Kommunes Etableringsstipend 2008
Vossajazzprisen 2008

Discography (in selection)

As band leader 
2011: Mountains & the Sea (Komanche), within his M.B. Trio

Collaborative works 
With Ralph Myerz and the Jack Herren Band
2004: Your New Best Friends (Emperor Norton)
2006: Sharp Knives And Loaded Guns (EMI Music (Norway)/Virgin)

With others
2002: Kevin Keegan (Bergen), with the band "Logikal"
2003: Superworldunknown (Waterfall, Norway), with Karin Park
2003: Hush Hush (EMI Music, Norway), with Nathalie Nordnes
2003: Tafler Julen Inn (PS!), with "Kniv og Taffel"

References

External links 

Norwegian jazz guitarists
Norwegian musicians
Scandinavian musicians
Avant-garde jazz guitarists
Norwegian University of Science and Technology alumni
Musicians from Bergen
1977 births
Living people
21st-century Norwegian guitarists